Promoresia is a genus of riffle beetles in the family Elmidae. There are at least two described species in Promoresia.

Species
These two species belong to the genus Promoresia:
 Promoresia elegans (Leconte, 1852) i c g b
 Promoresia tardella (Fall, 1925) i c g b
Data sources: i = ITIS, c = Catalogue of Life, g = GBIF, b = Bugguide.net

References

Further reading

External links

 

Elmidae
Articles created by Qbugbot